Henry William Furse "Bill" Hoskyns MBE (19 March 1931 – 4 August 2013) was a British fencer who appeared at six Olympic Games.,

Fencing career
Hoskyns, born in London won two silver medals in 1960 and 1964 Olympic Games. No British fencer has won an Olympic medal since. He competed with all three weapons (doing so in the 1956 and 1964 Olympics) but he was especially effective at Épée, where he was 1958 World Champion. He is one of only five fencers to compete in at least six Olympic Games.

He was eight times British champion, winning three foil, four epee and one sabre title at the British Fencing Championships. Only Edgar Seligman had previously achieved winning the British title with the three different weapons and his great rival, Allan Jay failed to win the sabre title. During the time (1950 to 1970) that fencing was a sport at the Commonwealth Games, Hoskyns won nine gold (four individual) and one silver medal. Individually, he won gold in both épée and sabre in 1958, gold in épée and silver in foil 1966, gold in Épée in 1970.

At the 1960 Summer Olympics in Rome, he was part of the British silver medal-winning épée team. At the 1964 Summer Olympics in Tokyo, Hoskyns won silver in the épée, losing to Soviet fencer Grigory Kriss in the final.

See also
List of athletes with the most appearances at Olympic Games

References

External links
 Malcolm Fare's Biography of Bill Hoskyns
Commonwealth Fencing medalists for Britons

1931 births
2013 deaths
British male fencers
Olympic fencers of Great Britain
Fencers at the 1956 Summer Olympics
Fencers at the 1960 Summer Olympics
Fencers at the 1964 Summer Olympics
Fencers at the 1968 Summer Olympics
Fencers at the 1972 Summer Olympics
Fencers at the 1976 Summer Olympics
Members of the Order of the British Empire
Olympic silver medallists for Great Britain
Olympic medalists in fencing
Commonwealth Games gold medallists for England
Commonwealth Games silver medallists for England
Sportspeople from London
Medalists at the 1960 Summer Olympics
Medalists at the 1964 Summer Olympics
Commonwealth Games medallists in fencing
Fencers at the 1958 British Empire and Commonwealth Games
Fencers at the 1966 British Empire and Commonwealth Games
Fencers at the 1970 British Commonwealth Games
English Olympic medallists
Medallists at the 1958 British Empire and Commonwealth Games
Medallists at the 1966 British Empire and Commonwealth Games
Medallists at the 1970 British Commonwealth Games